The Division of Calwell is an Australian Electoral Division in the state of Victoria.

Calwell contains the extreme northwestern fringe of Melbourne. It includes the suburbs of Broadmeadows, Dallas, Coolaroo, Greenvale, Meadow Heights, Roxburgh Park, Craigieburn and Mickleham.

Calwell has been a safe Labor seat since it was created in 1984. Calwell has had only two members, Dr. Andrew Theophanous, from 1984-2001, and the current MP Maria Vamvakinou, since 2001. Both are members of the Australian Labor Party.

History

The division was created in 1984 and is named for Arthur Calwell, who was Minister for Immigration 1945–1949 and Leader of the Australian Labor Party 1960–1967.

Calwell has been a safe Labor seat since it was first contested. The seat's first MP elected in 1984 was Andrew Theophanous. After failing to retain Labor preselection due to issues of criminality, Theophanous unsuccessfully contested the 2001 election as an Independent, polling 9.6% of the vote. The current Member for Calwell, since the 2001 federal election, is Maria Vamvakinou, a member of the Australian Labor Party. Calwell is currently Labor's second safest seat, with 68.80% on the 2PP.

At the 2011 Census, Calwell had the nation's most stable population, with only 25.6% of residents having moved in the last five years. The electorate had the nation's third highest proportion of Catholics (38.5%) and the third highest proportion of residents of Islamic faith (16.8%), the highest in Victoria.

In 2017, Calwell had the highest "no" vote for marriage equality in Victoria, with 56.8% of the electorate's respondents to the survey responding "No".

Boundaries
Since 1984, federal electoral division boundaries in Australia have been determined at redistributions by a redistribution committee appointed by the Australian Electoral Commission. Redistributions occur for the boundaries of divisions in a particular state, and they occur every seven years, or sooner if a state's representation entitlement changes or when divisions of a state are malapportioned.

The division is located in the north-western suburbs of Melbourne.

Demographics 
Calwell is a diverse and socially conservative electorate. Calwell includes Victoria's largest Iraqi community along with Turkish and Lebanese diaspora. While a stronghold for the center-left Labor Party, the religious migrant community rallied against same-sex marriage in 2017, with 17.7% of the electorate from an Islamic background, six times the state average, while 34% are Catholic, 12% higher than the rest of the state.

The incumbent MP, Maria Vamvakinou, is herself a migrant from the Greek island of Lefkada and her parents migrated to Melbourne when she was four. She is fluent in Greek and taught the language in her time as a teacher.

Members

Election results

References

External links
 Division of Calwell - Australian Electoral Commission

Electoral divisions of Australia
Constituencies established in 1984
1984 establishments in Australia
City of Hume
Broadmeadows, Victoria
Electoral districts and divisions of Greater Melbourne